Diamond Harbour is a small town on Banks Peninsula, in Canterbury, New Zealand. It is on the peninsula's northern coast, on the southern shores of Lyttelton Harbour, and is administratively part of the city of Christchurch.

Naming
The area was named by Mark Stoddart for the way the sunlight glints of the water. He bought  of land in the area in 1856 to farm. The name also applies to the bay within Lyttelton Harbour / Whakaraupō adjacent to the settlement. In 1949, the bay's name changed from Te Waipapa Harbour to Diamond Harbour (Te Waipapa). In 2003, the name changed further to Te Waipapa / Diamond Harbour.

Godley House 
Godley House was built in 1880 by Harvey Hawkins (a ship chandler, ironmonger and financial speculator) on land purchased from Mark Stoddart. This large family home was renowned for parties with party goers arriving on Harry Hawkin's steam launch, the Waiwera. Hawkins went bankrupt and the house and contents were auctioned off in 1896.

It did not sell and the Stoddart family, as secured creditors, acquired the property and moved in until the death of Anna Stoddart in 1911. Her daughter Margaret Stoddart lived there also and painted several pictures of Godley House. 

The property was then sold to the Lyttelton Borough Council. At that time it was named Godley House after John Robert Godley. 

Godley House and the land surrounding it was made a recreational reserve in 2006.

It was used as a hotel, restaurant and conference centre prior to the September 2010 Canterbury Earthquake. 

Godley House was badly damaged in the September 2010 earthquake but it was thought that it could be repaired. However, damage caused by the February 2011 earthquake left engineers recommending the Category II Historic Place be  demolished.

Stoddart Cottage 
Stoddart Cottage, built for Stoddart's wedding in 1862, is the oldest building still standing in Diamond Harbour. It was registered by the New Zealand Historic Places Trust as a Category I historic building in 1990. The artist Margaret Stoddart grew up in the cottage. It is open on weekends and public holidays. It hosts art exhibitions on occasions.

Demographics 

Diamond Harbour had a population of 1,497 at the 2018 New Zealand census, an increase of 192 people (14.7%) since the 2013 census, and an increase of 288 people (23.8%) since the 2006 census. There were 666 households. There were 732 males and 765 females, giving a sex ratio of 0.96 males per female. The median age was 48.9 years (compared with 37.4 years nationally), with 261 people (17.4%) aged under 15 years, 132 (8.8%) aged 15 to 29, 768 (51.3%) aged 30 to 64, and 336 (22.4%) aged 65 or older.

Ethnicities were 95.6% European/Pākehā, 6.4% Māori, 1.6% Pacific peoples, 1.6% Asian, and 1.2% other ethnicities (totals add to more than 100% since people could identify with multiple ethnicities).

The proportion of people born overseas was 30.9%, compared with 27.1% nationally.

Although some people objected to giving their religion, 61.9% had no religion, 28.5% were Christian, 0.6% were Buddhist and 3.0% had other religions.

Of those at least 15 years old, 471 (38.1%) people had a bachelor or higher degree, and 99 (8.0%) people had no formal qualifications. The median income was $37,900, compared with $31,800 nationally. The employment status of those at least 15 was that 582 (47.1%) people were employed full-time, 234 (18.9%) were part-time, and 15 (1.2%) were unemployed.

Amenities 

The centre of the village has a restaurant, a library, community hall, a rugby club, a bowls club, a croquet club and a medical centre, all overlooking the village cricket pitch and rugby field. Orton Bradley Park is located very close to the township of Diamond Harbour. As of 2021 it has a Four Square.

Education
Diamond Harbour School is a full primary school catering for years 1 to 8.

Transport 
A ferry connects Diamond Harbour to Lyttelton, on the harbour's northern shore. In combination with buses from Lyttelton to Christchurch, this allows residents of Diamond Harbour to commute to the city. Diamond Harbour is 25 kilometres via the Governors Bay road to Lyttelton.

References

External links

 The Official Diamond Harbour Community Association website
 The Original Diamond Harbour website 

Banks Peninsula
Suburbs of Christchurch
Populated places in Canterbury, New Zealand